Gary Hurney (born 1980) is an Irish dual player of hurling and Gaelic football who formerly played for the Waterford senior team in both codes. 

Hurney made his first appearance for the Waterford football team during the 1999 championship against cork and immediately became a regular member of the starting fifteen. He also spent three seasons with the Waterford senior hurling team. During his inter-county career Hurney has enjoyed little success. He was an All-Ireland runner-up in hurling on one occasion. He announced his retirement from inter-county football in December 2013, citing injuries and family commitments. 

Hurney plays his club hurling and football with Abbeyside–Ballinacourty. He has won three county football championship medals with his beloved Abbeyside–Ballinacourty.

Awards
 2007 Waterford Senior footballer of the year
 1998 Waterford Minor footballer of the year
 2006 Munster Senior Football All Star
2008 Waterford senior footballer of the year
 2013 Waterford Senior Footballer of the year

References 

1980 births
Living people
Dual players
Ballinacourty Gaelic footballers
Abbeyside hurlers
Waterford inter-county Gaelic footballers
Waterford inter-county hurlers
Gaelic games players from County Galway